Gigi Fernández and Natasha Zvereva were the three-time defending champions, and successfully defended their title, defeating Jana Novotná and Arantxa Sánchez Vicario in the final 6–7(6–8), 6–4, 7–5.

Seeds
Champion seeds are indicated in bold text while text in italics indicates the round in which those seeds were eliminated.

Draw

Finals

Top half

Section 1

Section 2

Bottom half

Section 3

Section 4

External links
1995 French Open – Women's draws and results at the International Tennis Federation

Women's Doubles
French Open by year – Women's doubles
1995 in women's tennis
1995 in French women's sport